Sankoyo Bush Bucks Football Club is an association football club from Sankoyo, Botswana. They formerly played in the top domestic Botswana Premier League until their relegation in 2019. They play home games in Maun.

Their colours are green and white. Their nickname is "Ngurungu", the local name for a bushbuck.

History
Sankoyo Bush Bucks were founded in 1996 and began play in 2000. They gained promotion to the Premier League in 2014, becoming the first team from the northwestern Nhabe region to play in the Botswana top flight.

The Bush Bucks were docked 29 points after the end of the 2015 season which meant they would be relegated after using an unregistered player, Zimbabwean Morris Ruzivo. However, they won their appeal and remained in the Botswana Premier League. They were relegated at the end of the 2019 season.

Ownership
The team has been largely supported by the Sankoyo Community Trust. The trust contributed about P200,000 each season to support the team.

Coaches
Philani Mabhena (2016)
Drago Stanalojvic (2016)

References

External links
Soccerway

Football clubs in Botswana
1998 establishments in Botswana